Tem or TEM may refer to:

Acronyms 
 Threat and error management, an aviation safety management model.
 Telecom Expense Management
 Telecom Equipment Manufacturer
 TEM (currency), local to Volos, Greece
 TEM (nuclear propulsion), a Russian spacecraft propulsion system
 Test For English Majors, like College English Test in China
 Tram Elettrici Mendrisiensi, a former tramway in  Ticino, Switzerland
 Transient electromagnetics
 Transmission electron microscopy (or microscope)
 Transverse electromagnetic mode, a transverse mode
 Trans-European Motorways, a regional project
 Triethylenemelamine, a chemotherapeutic agent

People, personnages, characters
 Atum or Tem, an Egyptian deity
 Tem (queen), an ancient Egyptian queen consort
 Tem people of Togo, living around Sokodé

Places
 Tem, Tajikistan, a small town just outside Khorugh in the Gorno-Badakhshan Autonomous Province
 Temora Airport (IATA airport code TEM)

Other uses
 Tem language
 TEM beta-lactamase

See also

 
 
 
 TEMS (disambiguation)